The canton of Voiron is an administrative division of the Isère department, eastern France. Its borders were modified at the French canton reorganisation which came into effect in March 2015. Its seat is in Voiron.

It consists of the following communes:
 
La Buisse
Coublevie
La Murette
Saint-Aupre
Saint-Cassien
Saint-Étienne-de-Crossey
Saint-Nicolas-de-Macherin
La Sure en Chartreuse
Voiron
Voreppe

References

Cantons of Isère